Hendrik Niehoff ( – December 1560) was a Dutch pipe organ builder.

Life 
Niehoff was born in Leeuwarden and served as an apprentice to pipe organ builder Jan van Covelen. After Van Covelen's death, Niehoff established his shop in 's-Hertogenbosch to continue building new and upgrading organs throughout the Netherlands and in major Hanseatic cities and is considered one of the most significant organ builders in northwestern Europe in the middle third of the 16th century.

Craftsmanship 
The pipes in Niehoff's organs use an alloy of over 98% lead, with only about 1.3% tin and minimal amounts of antimony, copper and bismuth. Pipes made of this alloy are noted for producing sounds with the "vocale" characteristic of the organs of the high Renaissance–early Baroque period. To enhance their appearance, the façade pipes usually were covered with thin, bright tin foil that was held to the underlying lead pipe with a glue made of duck egg white.

American organbuilder John Brombaugh has used several surviving examples of pipes from the 1539 Schoonhoven Niehoff organ as models for many instruments his firm made and used in the organ at Central Lutheran Church, Eugene, Oregon, that was dedicated in 1976. This instrument also uses vertical pallets in its ruckpositive windchest, a method that was normal in Niehoff's organs but seldom found anytime since.

See also 
 List of pipe organ builders

References

Further reading 

 
 
 
 
 

1495 births
1561 deaths
Dutch musicians
Dutch pipe organ builders
People from Leeuwarden